UniQ Aotearoa (UniQ) was Queer Students' Association of New Zealand, a collection of queer student groups at universities, polytechs and colleges of education in New Zealand.

UniQ was active at most New Zealand universities and several polytechnics. The term queer was considered to had been reclaimed and was used by UniQ to acknowledge both gender and sexual diversity. It was considered to be collective term for non-heterosexual and non-cisgender identities; inclusive but not exclusive to lesbian, gay, bisexual, transgender, takatāpui, intersex and asexual people.

The name 'UniQ' comes from the name given to the work carried out by Matt Soeberg. Soeberg was employed as a Queer Project Worker by New Zealand Union of Students' Associations (NZUSA) to address the needs of queer students. The overall name given to the work was 'UNIQ - Creating Support for Lesbian, Gay, Bisexual and Transgender Students' which was eventually adopted by various student groups as their name.

UniQ worked to promote education and understanding for and about queer students undertaking tertiary study and regular events held around New Zealand's tertiary institutions. This included Pride Week when local UniQs facilitate a week-long series of events usually culminating in a dance party.

Members 
UniQ Aotearoa was made up of various local iterations of UniQ and other queer student groups at different universities and polytechs across New Zealand.

National Conferences 
UniQ used to meet once annually at a national conference, starting from 1997. Initially known as the Queer Youth and Students (UniQ) Conference, these conferences were opportunities for students across New Zealand to come together to discuss and address the wide range of current issues facing queer students. These conferences usually included workshops, planning sessions and guest speakers (including political, religious and disabled speakers).

See also 
 LGBT New Zealand
 Gay rights in New Zealand

References

External links
 UniQ national website

Students' associations in New Zealand
LGBT organisations in New Zealand
LGBT student organizations